Lord Crewe may refer to:
John Crew, 1st Baron Crew (1598–1679)
Thomas Crew, 2nd Baron Crew (1624–1697)
Nathaniel Crew, 3rd Baron Crew (1633–1721)
John Crewe, 1st Baron Crewe (1742–1829)
John Crewe, 2nd Baron Crewe (1772–1835)
Hungerford Crewe, 3rd Baron Crewe (1812–1894)
Robert Crewe-Milnes, 1st Marquess of Crewe (1858–1945)

Crewe